Dyatkovsky (masculine), Dyatkovskaya (feminine), or Dyatkovskoye (neuter) may refer to:
Dyatkovsky District, a district of Bryansk Oblast, Russia
Dyatkovsky Urban Administrative Okrug, an administrative division which the town of Dyatkovo and five rural localities in Dyatkovsky District of Bryansk Oblast, Russia are incorporated as
Dyatkovskoye Urban Settlement, a municipal formation which Dyatkovsky Urban Administrative Okrug in Dyatkovsky District of Bryansk Oblast, Russia is incorporated as